The 1970–71 Cupa României was the 34th edition of Romania's most prestigious football cup competition.

The title was won by Rapid București against Jiul Petroşani.

Format
The competition is an annual knockout tournament.

In the first round proper, two pots were made, first pot with Divizia A teams and other teams till 16 and the second pot with the rest of teams qualified in this phase. Each tie is played as a single leg.

First round proper matches are played on the ground of the lowest ranked team, then from the second round proper the matches are played on a neutral location.

In the first round proper, if a match is drawn after 90 minutes, the game goes in extra time, and if the scored is still tight after 120 minutes, the team who played away will qualify.

In the second round proper, if a match is drawn after 90 minutes, the game goes in extra time, and if the scored is still tight after 120 minutes, then the team from the lower division will qualify. If the teams are from the same division, the younger team will qualify.

In the semi-finals, if a match is drawn after 90 minutes, the game goes in extra time, and if the scored is still tight after 120 minutes, the winner will be established at penalty kicks.

From the first edition, the teams from Divizia A entered in competition in sixteen finals, rule which remained till today.

Bracket

First round proper

|colspan=3 style="background-color:#FFCCCC;"|1 March 1972

|-
|colspan=3 style="background-color:#FFCCCC;"|5 March 1972

|-
|colspan=3 style="background-color:#FFCCCC;"|9 March 1972

|}

Second round proper

|colspan=3 style="background-color:#FFCCCC;"|15 March 1972

|}

Quarter-finals 

|colspan=3 style="background-color:#FFCCCC;"|29 March 1972

|}

Semi-finals

|colspan=3 style="background-color:#FFCCCC;"|28 June 1972

|}
Notes:
 Jiul Petroşani vs. Dinamo București is first match from Romanian Cup finished after penalty kicks.

Final

References

External links
 romaniansoccer.ro
 Official site
 The Romanian Cup on the FRF's official site

Cupa României seasons
1971–72 in Romanian football
Romania